Onøya is an island in Lurøy Municipality in Nordland county, Norway. The  island lies immediately south of the island of Lurøya and southwest of the island of Stigen. The island is connected to Lurøya by a short bridge. Onøya sits just west of the mouth of the Sjona fjord. It is only accessible by boat. In 2017, there were 279 residents of the island.

See also
List of islands of Norway

References

Lurøy
Islands of Nordland